Jerrymanders, or Solifugae, are a group of arachnids.

Jerrymandering is a form of electoral manipulation.

See also 
 Germander, a group of plants